The 2017 Tokyo Marathon was the eleventh edition of the annual marathon race in Tokyo, Japan and was held on Sunday, 26 February. An IAAF Gold Label Road Race, it was the first World Marathon Majors event to be held that year. The men's race was won by Wilson Kipsang in a New Course Record of 2:03:58. The women's race was won by Sarah Chepchirchir.

Results
Official results English

Men

Women

References

External links

Official website

Tokyo Marathon
Tokyo
2017 in Tokyo
Tokyo Marathon
February 2017 sports events in Japan